Fort Dodge is a city in and the county seat of Webster County, Iowa, United States, along the Des Moines River. The population was 24,871 in the 2020 census, a decrease from 25,136 in 2000. Fort Dodge is a major commercial center for North Central and Northwest Iowa. It is located on U.S. Routes 20 and 169.

History

Fort Dodge traces its beginnings to 1850 when E Company of the 6th Infantry were sent from Fort Snelling to erect and garrison  a fort at the junction of the Des Moines River and Lizard Creek. It was originally named Fort Clarke but was renamed Fort Dodge because there was another fort with the same name in Texas. It was named after Henry Dodge, a governor of Wisconsin Territory (which had included Iowa until Iowa became a state in 1846). The fort was abandoned by the Army in 1853.

The next year William Willams, a civilian storekeeper in Fort Dodge, purchased the land and buildings of the old fort. The town of Fort Dodge was founded in 1869. In 1872 the long and continuing history of gypsum production in Iowa started when George Ringland, Webb Vincent, and Stillman T. Meservey formed the Fort Dodge Plaster Mills to mine, grind, and prepare gypsum for commercial use. The Company constructed the first gypsum mill west of the Mississippi River, at the head of what is now known as Gypsum Creek.

In 2018, Kris Patrick, Executive Director of Fort Dodge Main Street, stated that Fort Dodge is locally referred to as "Little Chicago" because architects modeled downtown buildings to resemble Chicago in the mid-1900s.

Geography
Fort Dodge is located at  (42.506803, −94.180271), on the Des Moines River.

Climate
Fort Dodge has a Humid continental climate with cold winters and hot humid summers.

Demographics

2010 census
As of the census of 2010, there were 25,206 people, 10,275 households, and 5,850 families residing in the city. The racial makeup of the city was 89.7% White, 5.5% African American, 0.4% Native American, 0.8% Asian, 1.4% from other races, and 2.2% from two or more races. Hispanic or Latino of any race were 5.0% of the population.

There were 10,275 households, of which 27.5% had children under the age of 18 living with them, 39.5% were married couples living together, 13.0% had a female householder with no husband present, 4.4% had a male householder with no wife present, and 43.1% were non-families. 36.8% of all households were made up of individuals, and 14.4% had someone living alone who was 65 years of age or older. The average household size was 2.21 and the average family size was 2.89.

The median age in the city was 36.8 years. 21.8% of residents were under the age of 18; 13.2% were between the ages of 18 and 24; 23.4% were from 25 to 44; 25.3% were from 45 to 64; and 16.2% were 65 years of age or older. The gender makeup of the city was 51.3% male and 48.7% female.

2000 census
As of the census of 2000, there were 25,136 people, 10,470 households, and 6,376 families residing in the city. The racial makeup of the city was 92.47% White, 3.79% African American, 0.21% Native American, 0.85% Asian, 0.02% Pacific Islander, 1.30% from other races, and 1.36% from two or more races. Hispanic or Latino of any race were 2.94% of the population.

There were 10,470 households, out of which 29.0% had children under the age of 18 living with them, 45.9% were married couples living together, 11.4% had a female householder with no husband present, and 39.1% were non-families. 33.8% of all households were made up of individuals, and 14.1% had someone living alone who was 65 years of age or older. The average household size was 2.29 and the average family size was 2.94.

Age spread: 24.3% under the age of 18, 10.7% from 18 to 24, 25.2% from 25 to 44, 21.2% from 45 to 64, and 18.5% who were 65 years of age or older. The median age was 38 years. For every 100 females, there were 90.5 males. For every 100 females age 18 and over, there were 86.7 males.

The median income for a household in the city was $33,361, and the median income for a family was $42,555. Males had a median income of $31,253 versus $23,360 for females. The per capita income for the city was $18,018. About 7.7% of families and 11.6% of the population were below the poverty line, including 14.2% of those under age 18 and 7.2% of those age 65 or over.

Economy
The major industries of Fort Dodge are biofuels, livestock feed, gypsum and limestone mining, can production, drywall manufacturing, trucking, the manufacture of veterinary pharmaceuticals and vaccines, and retail.

Gypsum rock is processed into drywall and plaster products at several Fort Dodge manufacturing facilities. Drywall was patented by a Fort Dodge resident, and the gypsum used to create the Cardiff Giant hoax of the late 19th century was mined at Fort Dodge. Currently National Gypsum Company, Georgia Pacific Corporation, Celotex Corporation (now CertainTeed corporation) and the United States Gypsum Company operate gypsum facilities in and around Fort Dodge.

Fort Dodge is the home of Fort Dodge Animal Health (a division of Boehringer Ingelheim), a major producer of pharmaceuticals and vaccines for veterinarian use. The company's headquarters were moved from Fort Dodge to Overland Park, Kansas in 1995. Two of the company's three United States manufacturing plants are located in Fort Dodge.

At least three major national trucking companies (primarily flatbed carriers serving the drywall industry) are based in Fort Dodge. The city also serves as a retail center for North-Central Iowa.

For most of the 20th century, meatpacking was a major industry in Fort Dodge. The last two large meatpacking plants (owned by Iowa Beef Processors and Hormel) closed during the 1980s, when such companies moved their facilities closer to beef production in western states such as the Dakotas. One of the laboratories of Fort Dodge Animal Health was built on the site of a former Hormel processing plant.

The Fort Dodge Correctional Facility, a 1,250-bed medium-security state prison, opened in 1998.

Arts and culture

Historical
The Fort Museum and Frontier Village is located on the southwest edge of Fort Dodge. It is a full-scale recreation of a military outpost on the prairie from the 19th century. It also features a reconstructed  village from the same time period.  Additionally, The Fort Museum has a replica of the Cardiff Giant, an archaeological hoax sculpted from gypsum mined at Fort Dodge.  A "Frontier Days" event is held annually on the Fort Museum grounds. It features a parade, beauty pageant, historical reenactments, a buckskinner camp, and live entertainment. 2014 marked the 40th year of the event.

Art
The Blanden Memorial Art Museum, the first public museum of art in the state of Iowa, is located in the historic Oak Hill district of Fort Dodge. The Blanden opened June 5, 1932. The permanent collection on display includes European and American artists prints, sculptures and paintings. The museum also offers art classes for children and adults.

Music
Fort Dodge maintains several music organizations, including a civic choral society, a city-funded municipal band, regional symphony orchestra, a Christian choral union, and a men's barbershop chorus. In 1896, the famous composer Edvard Grieg composed a piece entitled, "Impromptu to Grieg Men's Chorus in Fort Dodge, Iowa."

Shellabration is an annual rock concert held in late July/early August at the Oleson Park Music Pavilion, featuring nationally touring rock groups.  Previous performing bands include Journey, Foreigner, REO Speedwagon, and Lynyrd Skynyrd.

The Lizard Creek Blues Society sponsors an annual blues festival, "Blues Under the Trees," every summer, drawing blues musicians from all over the United States.

Fort Dodge Choir Boosters (affiliated with Fort Dodge Senior High School) hosts the annual "Fort Dodge Choral Festival," which features high school and college choirs from around the upper Midwest under the direction of a nationally recognized conductor/composer.

Fort Dodge Senior High School serves as a host location for the Iowa State Marching Band Festival, State Solo & Small Ensemble Festival, and regional high school jazz band competitions.

Theater
Theater and musical theater are historically popular arts activities in Fort Dodge, with the community maintaining three independent theater organizations. Hawkeye Community Theatre puts on six full-length productions a year of varied genre. Comedia Musica Players is a civic musical theater troupe that produces an annual musical each fall.  Stage Door Productions provides theater training and performance opportunities for middle school, high school, and college-aged students during the summer. It produces one small-cast (10 or fewer) play per year.

The two local high schools and the community college produce a student-cast musical each Spring.  The Fort Dodge Senior High School musical is the longest-running high school musical theater tradition in the United States, first produced in 1927.

Historical structures

Parks and recreation
Oleson Park has woods and hiking trails. The town's recently restored band shell is located here.

Snell-Crawford Park (located at Williams Drive and 12th Avenue North) is a local favorite for weekend recreation. It has a disc golf course, three sand volleyball courts, a jogging/walking/bicycling trail, picnic tables, and grills. Soldier Creek runs through the park.

Rosedale Rapids, the city's new multimillion-dollar aquatic center, opened north of the roundabout intersection of 10th Avenue North and North 32nd Street in July 2010.  The aquatic center features swimming pools, water slides, and a lazy river.

John F. Kennedy Park is the nearest camping facility to Fort Dodge. It has a large campground, a lake with a swimming beach, a playground, and hiking trails. Lakeside Municipal Golf Course, an 18-hole course, is located here.

The  Gypsum City Off-Highway Vehicle Park opened to the public on July 6, 2006. The park is located on abandoned gypsum mines.

Fort Dodge is a top tubing destination in the state, offering the swift and clear waters of Lizard Creek, solitude on the Des Moines River from Fort Dodge to the Dolliver Memorial State Park, and the nearby lake at Brushy Creek.

The Fort Dodge Country Club par 71 golf course is one of Iowa's top courses.

Woodman Hollow State Preserve lies roughly 7 miles southeast of Fort Dodge.

Fort Frenzy opened east of town in late 2013. It features family-friendly activities such as an arcade, bumper boats, bumper cars, mini golf, go karts, laser tag, skating, and bowling.

Education
Fort Dodge is the home to the central campus of Iowa Central Community College.

Fort Dodge is served by the Fort Dodge Community School District. The public school system includes Fort Dodge Senior High School (9−12), Fort Dodge Middle School (5−8), and several elementary schools. Duncombe Elementary closed briefly in 2015 due to structural issues, and was operating in the former Fair Oaks Middle School. The new building opened in Fall 2018, and serves grades 1–4. Private schools in Fort Dodge include St. Edmond (Preschool−12), Community Christian School (Preschool−8), St Paul Lutheran (Preschool−8), and Harvest Baptist School (K−12).

Fort Dodge has been the location of Iowa High School Athletic Association championship events.  Currently, the cross country championships are held at John F. Kennedy Park north of the town. Fort Dodge also hosts the Iowa girls' softball championship tournament at Harlan Rogers Park.

Media
AM radio stations
 540 KWMT (Three Eagles Communications, news/country/farm) 5 kW  day/.2 kW night
 1400 KVFD (Three Eagles Communications, news/talk/sports) – 1 kW

FM radio stations
 88.1 KICB (Iowa Central Community College Broadcasting, "88.1 The Point", alternative rock) – 0.2 kW
 89.5 KLFG (Family Radio, "Family Radio", Religious) – 17 kW
 91.1 KNSK (Iowa State University/WOI Radio Group, NPR) 100 kW
 92.1 KZLB (Three Eagles Communications, "The Eagle", Classic Rock) – 6 kW
 94.5 KKEZ (Three Eagles Communications, "Mix 94.5", Hot Adult Contemporary) – 100 kW
 96.9 KIAQ (Three Eagles Communications, "Hot Country K97", Country) – 100 kW
 99.7 KXFT (Three Eagles Communications, "Sunny 99.7", Adult Contemporary) – 25 kW
 105.9 KTLB (Three Eagles Communications, "Hippie Radio", Oldies) – 25 kW

Online radio stations
 Fort Dodge Radio (Fort Dodge Radio, "80's With The 70's Best Rock!")

Broadcast television stations
 KTIN 21, local PBS member station, Iowa PBS network member.
 A commercial TV station, last known as KVFD-TV, an NBC affiliate, operated on channel 21 from 1953 until 1970 then moved to channel 50. On May 4, 1977, its tower and transmitter were destroyed by a tornado.  The owner died before he could rebuild it, and his heirs were not interested in continuing it.  KVFD was never rebuilt and the call letters have been returned to the FCC.  Fort Dodge is served from the television stations in the Ames-Des Moines metro area.

Print
 Fort Dodge Messenger, daily newspaper

Infrastructure

Surface transportation
U.S. Route 20 bypasses Fort Dodge to the south, and U.S. 169 skirts the west side of the city; both highways have business routes through town. Iowa Highway 7 has its terminus at the northwest edge of the city.

DART (Dodger Area Rapid Transit) maintains six local bus routes that connect to most commercial, medical, and educational locations on weekdays only.

Jefferson Bus lines serves Fort Dodge with a link to Williams, where travelers can connect to the expanded Jefferson line.

Airport
The Fort Dodge Regional Airport (FOD) is located just north of town. It is primarily a general aviation airport.

Health care
Unity Point Hospital, formerly Trinity Regional Medical Center, is Fort Dodge's only hospital.

Sister cities
As of December 13, 2016, Fort Dodge has one sister city:

Gjakova, Kosovo

Notable people 

Lewis Armistead (February 18, 1817 – July 5, 1863), as part of Pickett's Charge during the Battle of Gettysburg, he led his brigade to the high-water mark of the Confederacy
Emil Lewis Holmdahl (1883-1963), American infantryman, machine gunner, soldier of fortune, spy, gun runner, and treasure hunter
Lew Anderson (1922–2006), last Clarabell the Clown on Howdy Doody
Samuel Z. Arkoff (1918-2002), B movie producer
Cathie Beck (1955-present), journalist and writer
Suzanne M. Bianchi (1952–2013), sociologist
Joan Blaine (1910-1949), actress
Scott Bloomquist(1963-present), race car driver
Clara Breed (1906-1994), librarian and activist on behalf of Japanese-Americans during World War II
Holm O. Bursum (1867-1963), politician for the state of New Mexico
Cyrus Clay Carpenter (1829–1898), Governor of Iowa
Nick Collison (1980-present), professional basketball player
Gene Elston (1922-2015), sportscaster and Baseball Hall of Fame honoree
Nate Erdmann (1973-present), professional basketball player
Lou Fiene (1884–1964), Major League Baseball pitcher
Gene Ford (1912–1970), Major League Baseball pitcher
Robert Garrison (1960-2019), sculptor
William Greehey (1936-present), businessman and philanthropist born in Fort Dodge and graduated from Fort Dodge Senior High School in 1954. Founder of Valero Energy, Nustar Energy, and the 2001 recipient of the distinguished Horatio Alger Award
Thomas Heggen, author of Mister Roberts, which was made into a Broadway play and a Hollywood film
Walter Howey, journalist and editor
Mary Kelly, artist, social activist, educator and writer
Corita Kent, artist, social activist and nun
William S. Kenyon, U.S. senator and federal appeals court judge
Karl King, conductor
Bill Koll (1923–2003), NCAA champion, Wrestling Hall of Fame member
Lisa Koll (born 1987), NCAA record holder in 10,000 metres
Mitch Krebs, news anchor
Richard D. McCormick, director of Wells Fargo & Company
John M. Peters, lawyer and legislator
Katie Porter, member of the United States House of Representatives from California's 45th congressional district
Daniel Rhodes, ceramic artist and author
Steve Stark, television producer, president of production, MGM Television
Brad Steiger (1936-2018), writer
Jeff Struecker, U.S. Army chaplain and author
Bill Tilghman, lawman and gunslinger
Don Ultang,  Pulitzer Prize-winning photographer
Betsy Warland, poet and writer
Dale Warland, choral conductor and clinician
Kevin Wickander, MLB player

References

External links

Official Fort Dodge City Website
Greater Fort Dodge Growth Alliance (formerly Fort Dodge Chamber of Commerce and Webster County Development Corporation)
Fort Dodge Convention & Visitors Bureau
City Data Comprehensive Statistical Data and more about Fort Dodge, Iowa

 
Populated places established in 1850
Cities in Iowa
Micropolitan areas of Iowa
Cities in Webster County, Iowa
County seats in Iowa
1850 establishments in Iowa